United States gubernatorial elections were held on 3 November 1970, in 35 states and two territories.

During this election, the Democrats won a number of the governorships up for re-election via many ways, such as retirement of incumbent, term limits, or defeat of incumbent.

In 1970, Arizona, New Mexico and Wisconsin elected their governors to four-year terms for the first time, having previously elected them to two-year terms.

This election coincided with the Senate and the House elections.

Alabama 

In Alabama, Governor Albert Brewer (who succeeded to the governorship upon Lurleen Wallace's death in 1968) had to endure a very nasty Democratic primary against former Governor George Wallace. In addition, there were no Republicans in the race for governor. Wallace won the Democratic primary and in November the election.

Alaska 

In Alaska, then-Lt. Gov. Keith Miller had gotten the job of governor in 1969 after Walter Hickel resigned to be part of President Nixon's Cabinet. He lost in 1970 to former Governor William Egan.

Arizona 

In Arizona, governors were elected to serve two-year terms until 1970, when Jack Richard Williams was the first governor to be elected to a four-year term. Previously, Williams had been elected governor twice to two-year terms in 1966 and in 1968.  Arizona made the switch official from a two-year term to a four-year term in 1968 with an amendment.

Arkansas 

In Arkansas, Winthrop Rockefeller was the first Republican governor in Arkansas since the Reconstruction period. He was defeated in his bid for a third term, by the Democratic challenger Dale Bumpers.

California 

Incumbent Republican Governor and future President Ronald Reagan was elected to a second term as governor with about 53% of the vote over Speaker of the State Assembly Jesse Unruh.

Connecticut 

Incumbent John Dempsey, a Democrat, did not seek re-election.  Sixth District Congressman Thomas Joseph Meskill (Republican) defeated First District Congressman Emilio Q. Daddario (Democratic) 53.76% to 46.23%.

Colorado 

In Colorado, John Arthur Love won re-election. He served until 1973, when he would resign to become the first head of Energy Policy under President Nixon.

Florida 

Florida's Claude R. Kirk Jr. was another 'first Republican governor since Reconstruction' as well (he switched from Democrat to Republican early on), and was defeated by the Democrat Reubin Askew.

Georgia 

In Georgia, governors would be limited to one term until George Busbee was allowed to serve two, and was the first governor to serve two consecutive terms. Future president Jimmy Carter won the election.

Hawaii 

In Hawaii, Burns won another term in 1970, but in 1973, Burns had health problems and his Lt. Governor George Ariyoshi, took over-as acting governor, and in 1974, with Burns' retirement, won a term in his own right. Burns died in 1975.

Iowa 

Iowa also had its governors serving two-year terms until Robert D. Ray won a four-year term in 1974. Previously, Ray had won a two-year term in 1968, a two-year term this year (1970), and would win another two-year term in 1972. Iowa made the four-year term switch official with an amendment to the state's constitution in 1972.

Kansas 

Like Arizona and Iowa, Kansas also had its governors serving two-year terms until 1974, when a constitutional amendment was added, creating a four-year term system for governors. Docking was elected governor in 1966, 1968, 1970, and would get elected in 1972.  The first governor to get a four-year term was Robert Frederick Bennett in 1974.

Maine 

Beginning with the 1962 governor's race, Maine switched from a two-year term system to a four-year term system for the governors. John H. Reed was the first Maine governor to be elected to a four-year term. Kenneth Curtis was re-elected.

Maryland 

In Maryland, Mandel first won the governorship in 1969 in a special election when Agnew resigned in order to become vice president.

In 1970, Mandel ran for a full term and won.

Massachusetts 

In 1966, Massachusetts switched from a two-year to four-year terms for governors, and John A. Volpe was the first Massachusetts governor to be elected to a four-year term.  He had previously been elected to two-year terms in 1960 and in 1964. Volpe resigned in 1969 to become President Nixon's Secretary of Transportation.  Francis W. Sargent then became acting governor. In 1970, Sargent got a term in his own right.

Michigan 

In 1963, Michigan changed governors' terms from two years to four years. George W. Romney had won two-year terms in 1962 and 1964, and a four-year term in 1966. He resigned in 1969 to become President Nixon's Housing and Urban Development Secretary. William Milliken became governor, and got a full term
in 1970.

Nebraska 

In 1962, voters in Nebraska approved of an amendment, effective with the 1966 governor's race, that switched from two-year to four-year terms for governors. In 1966, the "two consecutive terms" rule was established. Norbert Tiemann was the first Nebraskan to get a four-year term with the 1966 governor's race. J. James Exon was elected governor.

New Mexico 

New Mexico also had a two-year term for governors until 1970, when the state constitution was changed to a four-year term for governors-without being allowed to have two consecutive terms.  
As for the "no two consecutive terms" rule, that was still on the books until 1991, when thanks to a change in the state's constitution, Bruce King was eligible for two consecutive terms. King was elected to the first of three non-consecutive terms.

New York 

In New York, Governor Nelson A. Rockefeller won re-election to a fourth term. Rockefeller served until 1973, when he resigned.

Pennsylvania 

In Pennsylvania, although the constitution was changed to allow governors to have two consecutive terms, the rule didn't apply to then current Gov. Raymond P. Shafer. The election was won by Milton Shapp.

South Carolina 

Governors in South Carolina weren't allowed two consecutive terms until 1980, when an amendment to the constitution was added. Richard Riley was the first South Carolina governor to have two consecutive terms with his 1982 re-election. John C. West won election.

South Dakota 

South Dakota also had governors on two-year terms until 1972, when a constitutional amendment allowed the governor to have a four-year term.
Richard F. Kneip would be the first governor to be elected to a four-year term, though he resigned to accept an appointment. Kneip, elected governor for a two-year term this year (1970), would be re-elected for another two-year term in 1972.

Tennessee 

In 1978, Tennessee changed its constitution to allow the governors to serve two consecutive terms. Winfield Dunn was elected this (1970) year.

Wisconsin 

In 1968, Wisconsin changed its constitution from a two-year term for governor to a four-year term. Upon his election this year, Patrick Lucey would become the first governor to serve a four-year term (see Wisconsin gubernatorial elections).

Wyoming
Governor Stanley K. Hathaway won re-election to a second four-year term.

United States gubernatorial elections 1970 chart

States

Territories

See also
1970 United States elections
1970 United States Senate elections
1970 United States House of Representatives elections

References

 
November 1970 events in the United States